Gabriel Gheorghe Caramarin (born 7 September 1977) is a Romanian football coach and former player who is current assistant manager of Jiangsu Suning.

Career
Caramarin was born in Măcin. He began his career at Sportul Studenţesc and made his debut in the Divizia A in 1994. After a short interlude at Gloria Bistrita, he rejoined Sportul in 1997, playing 16 matches for the Bucharest-based team. As Sportul relegated, he moved to FC Naţional, where he spent the next seven years of his career, making over 150 first league appearances. He joined Poli in the winter break of the 2004–05 season, together with Național coach Cosmin Olăroiu and teammates Gabriel Cânu, Gigel Coman and Marius Popa.

Caramarin made his debut for the Romania national team in a friendly against Germany, and scored on his debut in a 5–1 win. He went on to make another three appearances for Romania.

After retiring in 2009, he became the assistant coach of Unirea Urziceni and later Steaua București.

He won the Cupa României with Steaua București in 2011 as caretaker head coach.

Honours

Manager
Steaua București 
Cupa României: 2010–11

External links
 

1977 births
Living people
People from Măcin
Romanian footballers
Association football midfielders
Romania international footballers
FC Politehnica Timișoara players
ACF Gloria Bistrița players
FC Sportul Studențesc București players
FC Progresul București players
CS Otopeni players
FC Steaua București assistant managers
Romanian football managers
Romanian expatriate football managers
Romanian expatriate sportspeople in Cyprus
Expatriate football managers in Cyprus